Judas Iscariot was the apostle of Jesus who betrayed him.

Judas is also the Greek form of the Hebrew name Judah, and may refer to:

People
 Judah (son of Jacob), a patriarch
 Judas the Zealot, mentioned in the Epistle of the Apostles (Epistula Apostolorum), written in the 2nd century 
 Judas of Galilee, also Judas of Gamala, Jewish revolt leader
 Judas, alternate name of Jude, one of the brothers of Jesus
 Judas, in whose house on the Street called Straight in Damascus Saul of Tarsus regained his sight
 Judas Thomas Didymus or Saint Thomas
 Judas Thaddaeus, son of James, one of the twelve apostles
 Judas Cyriacus (died 360), man said to have assisted Helena of Constantinople to find the True Cross
 Judas Maccabeus, founder of the Hasmonean dynasty
 Judas Barsabbas, companion of the apostles Paul, Barnabas and Silas, emissary of the Church of Jerusalem to the Church at Antioch

Books
Gospel of Judas, an ancient Gnostic Gospel
"Judas" (short story), a 1967 short story by John Brunner
Judas (manga), a 2004 manga by Suu Minazuki

Film
Júdás, a 1918 Hungarian film
 Judas (1930 film), a Soviet silent drama film
 Judas (1936 film), a 1936 Mexican drama film
Judas (2001 film), a 2001 Italian-German television film with Enrico Lo Verso as Judas
Judas (2004 film), a 2004 American film with Johnathon Schaech as Judas Iscariot

Music

Albums
Judas (album), a 2017 album by Fozzy, or the title song
Judas (Quelentaro album), a 1970 album by Quelentaro
Judas, a 2011 album and the title song by Wisdom

Songs
"Judas" (ballad), a traditional English ballad
"Judas" (Lady Gaga song), 2011
"Judas", a 1953 song by Lucienne Delyle 
"Judas", a 1986 song by Helloween
"Judas", a 1993 song by Depeche Mode from Songs of Faith and Devotion  
"Judas", a 2007 song by Kelly Clarkson from My December  
"Judas", a 2017 song by Fozzy from the album of the same name
"Judas", a 2008 song by The Verve from Forth 
"Judas", a song by Cage the Elephant from their eponymous 2008 album
"Judas", a 2016 song by Banks from The Altar
"Judas", a 2021 song by Bad Gyal from Warm Up

Other Music
Judas Maccabaeus (Handel), an oratorio in three acts composed in 1746 by George Frideric Handel

Other uses
Judas, an upcoming video game
Judas goat, a trained goat used in animal herding
Judas animals, used to locate wild or feral members of their own species
Judas incident, an famous incident of heckling at a Bob Dylan concert

See also
Judas goat (disambiguation)
Judas kiss (disambiguation)
Judas Tree (disambiguation)
Jude (disambiguation)
Kingdom of Judah